Boadella may refer to:

People
 Albert Boadella, Spanish actor and director
 Genís Boadella (born 1979), Catalan politician

Places
Boadella i les Escaules, municipality in the comarca of the Alt Empordà
Boadella Reservoir, reservoir located on the Muga river

Catalan-language surnames